Edward Bertels (8 October 1932 – 9 March 2011) was a Belgian footballer. He played in two matches for the Belgium national football team in 1960.

Honours

Club
Antwerp
Belgian First Division A: 1956–57
Belgian First Division A runner-up: 1955–56, 1957–58, 1962–63
Belgian Cup: 1954–55

Waterschei
Belgian Third Division: 1963–1964

References

External links
 

1932 births
2011 deaths
Belgian footballers
Belgium international footballers
People from Geel
Association football midfielders
Footballers from Antwerp Province
Royal Antwerp F.C. players
K. Waterschei S.V. Thor Genk players
KFC Turnhout players
Belgian football managers
K.F.C. Eendracht Zele managers